General James Murray  (20 January 1721 – 18 June 1794) was a British Army officer and colonial administrator who served as the governor of Quebec from 1760 to 1768 and governor of Minorca from 1778 to 1782.  Born in Ballencrieff, East Lothian, Murray travelled to North America and took part in the French and Indian War. After the conflict, his administration of the Province of Quebec was noted for its successes, being marked by positive relationships with French Canadians, who were reassured of the traditional rights and customs. Murray died in Battle, East Sussex in 1794.

Early life

Born in Ballencrieff, East Lothian, Murray was a younger son of Lord Elibank Alexander Murray, 4th Lord Elibank, and his wife, Elizabeth Stirling. His cousin with two children was Alexander Murray (British Army officer, died 1762) Alexander Murray who served in Nova Scotia. Educated in Haddington, East Lothian Haddington, and Selkirk, Scottish Borders Selkirk, he began his military career in 1736 in the Scots Brigade of the Dutch state Army. In 1740 he served as a second lieutenant in Royal Marines Wynyard's Marines under his brother Patrick Murray, 5th Lord Elibank, in the Battle of Cartagena de India's unsuccessful attack on Cartagena, Colombia Cartagena. He returned as a captain in 1742. He served as captain of the grenadier company of the 15th Regiment of Foot during the War of the Austrian Succession. He was severely wounded during the Siege of Ostend (1745) Siege of Ostend in 1745 and distinguished himself in the Raid on Lorient in 1746. In December 1748, he married Cordelia Collier, who was from Hastings.

Career in Canada

James Murray purchased a commission for major in the 15th Regiment of Foot in 1749, and the lieutenant-colonelcy in 1751. He commanded his regiment in the Raid on Rochefort in 1757, defending Sir John Mordaunt in his subsequent court-martial. He commanded a battalion in the 1758 Siege of Louisbourg along with his brother Alexander.

When Louisbourg was taken, Murray accompanied General Wolfe on a raiding expedition northwards in the Gulf of St. Lawrence Campaign (1758). While Wolfe destroyed French settlements along the Gaspe Peninsula, Murray harried the French fishing settlements along Miramichi Bay. Part of the destruction included the homes and church at St. Anne's, now called Burnt Church.

Murray served under General James Wolfe at the Battle of the Plains of Abraham in 1759. Murray believed Wolfe's plan to land the army at Anse au Foulon was foolish and absurd, and succeeded "only by Providence". He was the military commander of Quebec City after it fell to the British. Lévis managed to defeat Murray and the British in the Battle of Sainte-Foy in 1760. As a result, the French managed to lay siege to Quebec but this had to abandoned due to a lack of supplies and the arrival of a British relief fleet.

He encouraged his favourite nephew Patrick Ferguson to follow him in a military career. Patrick was the son of Murray's sister Anne who was married to Lord Pitfour. He also assisted another nephew, Patrick Murray, illegitimate son of his brother, George.

Murray's successful part in the British advance on Montreal in which he pacified many of the French Canadians, showed his true worth as a military commander and a negotiator. On 5 September 1760, Murray signed a Treaty of Peace and Friendship with the Huron Nation, then residing at Lorette, near Quebec City. In 1990, that treaty was found by the Supreme Court of Canada to still be valid and binding on the Crown.

Governor of Quebec
In October 1760, he became military governor of the district of Quebec and became the first civil governor of the Province of Quebec on 4 October 1763. He was promoted Major-General on 26 March 1765. As governor he was sympathetic to the French-Canadians, favouring them over British merchants who came to settle in the wake of the conquest. He allowed the continuance of French civil law because at the time the French outnumbered the British 25:1 and he needed to be careful not to incite discontent or rebellion. The dissatisfaction of British settlers led to his recall in 1766 (although he remained governor in name until 1768), but his precedents were preserved in the Quebec Act of 1774. Murray successfully argued for the Quebec Act to continue slavery in Quebec as it had existed under the French; an advertisement appeared in the Quebec Gazette in 1769 for a "negro woman, aged 25 years, with a mulatto male child... formerly the property of General Murray".

On his return to Great Britain he was appointed Colonel of the 13th Regiment of Foot, a post he held from 1767 to 1789.

Minorca

Murray was lieutenant-governor from 1774 to 1778 and then governor of Minorca from 1778 to 1782. In 1780, he married, as his second wife, Ann Witham, daughter of the Consul-General there. During the American War of Independence, he defended Fort St. Philip, at Port Mahon, against a Franco-Spanish siege for seven months (1781–82), until forced to surrender. He was known as ‘Old Minorca’ Murray as a result.

He then returned to his home, Beauport Park, in Hollington, Sussex, where he died. Further honours came to him in his last years: he was appointed General, and Governor of Kingston-upon-Hull in 1783, and Colonel of the 21st (Royal North British) Fusiliers in 1789.  His body was laid to rest in the apse of the now ruined Old St Helen's Church, Hastings.

Family
His first marriage had been childless, but by his second, he had six children (two of whom died in infancy):
 James Patrick Murray, later a major general, who married Elizabeth Rushworth
 Cordelia Murray, who married Rev. Henry Hodges
 Wilhelmina Murray, married James Douglas, 4th Baron Douglas.
 George Murray (died in infancy)
 Elizabeth Mary Murray (died in infancy)
 Anne Harriet Murray

He and his wife also brought up his older brother Patrick, Lord Elibank's illegitimate daughter Maria Murray.

Popular culture
Murray appears in the 2004 film Battle of the Brave (Nouvelle-France) in his role as Governor of the new-captured Quebec. He is portrayed by Michael Maloney. He also appears in the same capacity in three episodes of the mini-series Marguerite Volant, where he is portrayed by Graham Harley.

See also
 Great Britain in the Seven Years War
 List of Governors General of Canada
 List of Governors of Minorca

Notes

References
 
 Browne, G. P.  "MURRAY, JAMES," in Dictionary of Canadian Biography, vol. 4, University of Toronto/Université Laval, 2003–, accessed 17 November 2015, online
 
 
 Murray, Colonel Hon. Arthur C., The Five Sons of "Bare Betty", London, 1936.
 Scott, S. Morley. "Civil and Military Authority in Canada, 1764–17661." Canadian Historical Review 9#2 (1928): 117–136.
 Wrong, George.  Canada and the American Revolution: the Disruption of the First British Empire. Toronto : MacMillan, 1935.

Primary sources
 James Murray. Journal of the Siege of Quebec, 1760
 James Murray. Report of the Government of Quebec in Canada, 5 June 1762
 William Draper. The Sentence of the Court-martial... for the Trial of the Hon. Lieut. Gen. James Murray, Late Governor of Minorca, on the Twenty-nine Articles Exhibited Against Him by Sir William Draper, London, 1783

External links
 National Battlefields Commission. The Plains of Abraham, Quebec, Canada.
 From the Warpath to the Plains of Abraham. Virtual Exhibition.
 Archives of James Murray (James Murray collection, R6393) are held at Library and Archives Canada

1721 births
1794 deaths
British Army generals
British Army personnel of the War of the Austrian Succession
Military personnel from East Lothian
Fellows of the Royal Society
Governors of the Province of Quebec (1763–1791)
East Yorkshire Regiment officers
King's Royal Rifle Corps officers
Royal Scots Fusiliers officers
Scottish slave owners
Somerset Light Infantry officers
Younger sons of barons
Persons of National Historic Significance (Canada)